Nahan is a town in India.

Nahan may also refer to:

 Mike Nahan (born 1950), politician
 Nahan Franko (1861–1930), violinist
 Nahan's partridge (Ptilopachus nahani), bird
 Stu Nahan (1926–2007), sportscaster
 Kang bed-stove (called nahan in the Manchu language)